Stephan Schurich (born 14 September 1967) is an Austrian sailor. He competed in the Flying Dutchman event at the 1992 Summer Olympics.

References

External links
 

1967 births
Living people
Austrian male sailors (sport)
Olympic sailors of Austria
Sailors at the 1992 Summer Olympics – Flying Dutchman
Sportspeople from Salzburg